This is a list of the mammal species recorded in Macau. There are 83 mammal species in Macau.

The following tags are used to highlight each species' conservation status as assessed by the International Union for Conservation of Nature:

Some species were assessed using an earlier set of criteria. Species assessed using this system have the following instead of near threatened and least concern categories:

Order: Sirenia (manatees and dugongs) 

Sirenia is an order of fully aquatic, herbivorous mammals that inhabit rivers, estuaries, coastal marine waters, swamps, and marine wetlands. All four species are endangered.

Family: Dugongidae
Genus: Dugong
 Dugong, Dugong dugon  extirpated

Order: Primates 

The order Primates contains humans and their closest relatives: lemurs, lorisoids, monkeys, and apes.

Suborder: Haplorhini
Infraorder: Simiiformes
Parvorder: Catarrhini
Superfamily: Cercopithecoidea
Family: Cercopithecidae (Old World monkeys)
Genus: Macaca
 Rhesus macaque, Macaca mulatta LR/nt
 Crab-eating macaque, Macaca fascicularis

Order: Rodentia (mice, squirrels, etc) 

The order Rodentia is a large group of mammals. They have two incisors in the upper as well as in the lower jaw which grow continuously and must be kept worn down by gnawing.

Muridae
Subfamily: Murinae
Genus: Bandicota
Greater bandicoot rat, Bandicota bengalensis
Chestnut spiny rat, Niviventer fulvescens
House mouse, Mus musculus
Brown rat, Rattus norvegicus
Ryukyu mouse, Mus caroli
Sikkim rat, Rattus andamanensis
Asiatic house rat, Rattus tanezumi
Roof rat, Rattus rattus
Family: Sciuridae
Pallas's squirrel, Callosciurus erythraeus introduced
Indian giant flying squirrel, Petaurista philippensis
Family: Hystricidae (porcupines)
Genus: Hystrix
 Malayan porcupine, Hystrix brachyura

Order: Chiroptera (bats) 

The bats' most distinguishing feature is that their forelimbs are developed as wings, making them the only mammals capable of flight. Bat species account for about 50% of all mammals.

Family: Pteropodidae
Genus: Rousettus
 Leschenault's rousette, Rousettus leschenaultia
Genus: Cynopterus
 Greater short-nosed fruit bat, Cynopterus sphinx
Family: Emballonuridae
Genus: Taphozous
Black-bearded tomb bat,  Taphozous melanopogon
Family: Rhinolophidae
Genus: Rhinolophus
Rufous horseshoe bat, Rhinolophus rouxi common
Intermediate horseshoe bat,  Rhinolophus affinus common
Least horseshoe bat, Rhinolophus pusillus common
Family: Hipposideridae
Genus: Hipposideros
Pomona roundleaf bat, Hipposideros pomona common
Himalayan roundleaf bat, Hipposideros armiger LC
Family: Vespertilionidae
Genus: Myotis
Large myotis, Myotis chinensis LR/lc
Rickett's big-footed bat, Myotis ricketti LR/lc
Fringed long-footed myotis, Myotis fimbriatus LR/nt No ??? LC
Horsfield's bat, Myotis horsfieldii LC rare in the region
Daubenton's bat, Myotis daubentonii rare
Genus: Pipistrellus
Japanese pipistrelle, Pipistrellus abramus
Chinese pipistrelle, Pipistrellus pulveratus rare
Genus: Nyctalus
Common noctule, Nyctalus noctula LR/lc LC
Genus: Tylonycteris
 Lesser bamboo bat, Tylonycteris pachypus LC rare in the region
Greater bamboo bat, Tylonycteris robustula
Genus: Scotophilus
Lesser yellow bat, Scotophilus kuhlii rare
Genus: Miniopterus
Western bent-winged bat, Miniopterus magnater LC common
Common bent-wing bat, Miniopterus schreibersii CD rare
Small bent-winged bat, Miniopterus pusillus
Family: Molossidae
Genus: Chaerephon
Wrinkle-lipped free-tailed bat, Chaerephon plicata

Order: Pholidota (pangolins) 

The order Pholidota comprises the eight species of pangolin. Pangolins are anteaters and have the powerful claws, elongated snout and long tongue seen in the other unrelated anteater species.

Family: Manidae
Genus: Manis
 Chinese pangolin, Manis pentadactyla LR/nt

Order: Cetacea (whales) 

The order Cetacea includes whales, dolphins and porpoises. They are the mammals most fully adapted to aquatic life with a spindle-shaped nearly hairless body, protected by a thick layer of blubber, and forelimbs and tail modified to provide propulsion underwater.

Suborder: Mysticeti
Family: Balaenidae
Genus: Eubalaena
 North Pacific right whale, Eubalaena japonica CR possibly seen historically
Family: Balaenopteridae
Subfamily: Megapterinae
Genus: Megaptera
 Humpback whale, Megaptera novaeangliae VU very rare today
Subfamily: Balaenopterinae
Genus: Balaenoptera
 Bryde's whale, Balaenoptera brydei DD
 Eden's whale, Balaenoptera edeni EN
Suborder: Odontoceti
Superfamily: Platanistoidea
Genus: Physeter
Family: Physeteridae
 Sperm whale, Physeter macrocephalus
Family: Kogiidae
Genus: Kogia
 Pygmy sperm whale, Kogia breviceps DD
 Dwarf sperm whale, Kogia sima DD
Family: Delphinidae (marine dolphins)
Family: Phocoenidae
Genus: Neophocaena
 Finless porpoise, Neophocaena phocaenoides phocaenoides DD
 Sunameri, Neophocaena phocaenoides sunameri DD
Genus: Sousa
Chinese white dolphin, Sousa chinensis NT local population is critically endangered
Genus: Tursiops
 Indo-Pacific bottlenose dolphin, Tursiops aduncus DD
 Common bottlenose dolphin, Tursiops truncatus DD
Genus: Delphinus
 Long-beaked common dolphin, Delphinus capensis DD
Genus: Stenella
 Pantropical spotted dolphin, Stenella attenuata LR/cd
 Spinner dolphin, Stenella longirostris DD
 Striped dolphin, Stenella coeruleoalba LR/cd
Genus: Steno
 Rough-toothed dolphin, Steno bredanensis LC
Genus: Lagenodelphis
 Fraser's dolphin, Lagenodelphis hosei DD
Genus: Grampus
 Risso's dolphin, Grampus griseus LC
Genus: Pseudorca
 False killer whale, Pseudorca crassidens EN

Order: Artiodactyla (herbivores) 

The order Artiodactyla in Macau are mainly herbivore which feed only on plant material, except wild boar. There are three types of herbivores (includes native and feral) in recent Hong Kong.

Family: Bovidae
Genus: Bubalus
 Feral water buffalo, Bubalus bubalis
Family: Bovidae
Genus: Bos
 Feral cattle, Bos taurus
Family: Cervidae
Genus: Muntiacus
 Indian muntjac, Muntiacus muntjak
 Reeve's muntjac, Muntiacus reevesi unconfirmed
Family: Suidae
Genus: Sus
 Wild boar, Sus scrofa

Order: Carnivora (carnivorans) 

There are over 260 species of carnivorans, the majority of which eat meat as their primary dietary item. They have a characteristic skull shape and dentition.

Suborder: Feliformia
Family: Felidae (cats)
Subfamily: Felinae
Genus: Prionailurus
 Leopard cat, Prionailurus bengalensis LC
 Feral cat, Felis catus
Subfamily: Pantherinae
Genus: Panthera
 Leopard, Panthera pardus
Family: Canidae (dogs, wolves, etc.)
Subfamily: Caninae
Genus: Vulpes
Red fox, Vulpes vulpes
Genus: Cuon
Dhole, Cuon alpinus
Genus: Canis
Feral dog, Canis familiaris
Family: Viverridae (civets, etc.)
Subfamily: Viverrinae
Genus: Viverricula
 Small Indian civet, Viverricula indica LR/lc
Large Indian civet, Viverra zibetha 
Masked palm civet, Paguma larvata taivana 
Family: Herpestidae (mongoose)
Subfamily: Herpestinae
Genus: Urva
Javan mongoose, Urva javanica
Crab-eating mongoose, Urva urva
Suborder: Caniformia
Family: Mustelidae (mustelids)
Genus: Mustela
 Yellow-bellied weasel, Mustela kathiah
Genus: Martes
 Yellow-throated marten, Martes flavigula
Genus: Lutra
 European otter, Lutra lutra NT
Genus: Melogale
 Chinese ferret badger, Melogale moschata

Notes

References

See also
Wildlife of China
List of chordate orders
Lists of mammals by region
List of prehistoric mammals
Mammal classification
List of mammals described in the 2000s

Macau
Mammals
Fauna of Macau
Macau